WCFC may refer to:

Broadcasting
 WCFC-LP, a low-power radio station (93.7 FM) licensed to Richmond, Virginia, United States
 WCFC-CA, a defunct television station (channel 51) that was licensed to Rockford, Illinois, United States
 WCPX-TV, a television station (channel 38) licensed to Chicago, Illinois that formerly used the WCFC call letters
WCFC-FM & WCFC (West Virginia), defunct radio stations licensed to Beckley, West Virginia.

Football
 Walton Casuals F.C.
 Wells City F.C.
 West Coburg Football Club
 Winchester Castle F.C.
 Winchester City F.C.
 Wollongong Community Football Club
 Wolverhampton Casuals F.C.
 Worcester City F.C.